Charbatia is a census town in Cuttack district  in the state of Odisha, India. It has an airbase operated by Indian air force.

Demographics
 census, Charibatia, India, had a population of 5232. Males constituted 54% of the population, and females 46%. Charibatia had an average literacy rate of 85%; male literacy was 88% and female, 81%. 10% of the population is under 6 years of age.

References

Cities and towns in Cuttack district